The superior dental plexus is a nerve plexus which supplies the upper jaw.

Formed by posterior superior alveolar nerve, middle superior alveolar nerve, and anterior superior alveolar nerve.

See also
 Inferior dental plexus

Maxillary nerve